The Ear of the Behearer is an album by American jazz saxophonist Dewey Redman featuring performances recorded in 1973 for the Impulse! label.  The CD reissue added four performances from Coincide (1974) as bonus tracks.

Reception
The Allmusic review by Scott Yanow awarded the album 4 stars stating "Some of the music is quite adventurous and free, while other tracks include some freebop, a struttin' blues, and quieter ballads... Intriguing music".

Track listing
All compositions by Dewey Redman
 "Interconnection" - 4:53 
 "Imani" - 7:07 
 "Walls-Bridges" - 4:06 
 "PS" - 5:36 
 "Boody" - 12:05 
 "Sunlanding" - 2:25 
 "Image (In Disguise)" - 6:32 
 "Seeds and Deeds" - 4:50 Bonus track on CD reissue
 "Joie de Vivre" - 3:19 Bonus track on CD reissue 
 "Funcitydues" - 3:19 Bonus track on CD reissue 
 "Qow" - 10:17 Bonus track on CD reissue 
Recorded at Generation Sound Studios in New York City on June 8 & 9, 1973 (tracks 1-7) and September 9 & 10, 1974 (tracks 8-11)

Personnel
Dewey Redman - tenor saxophone, alto saxophone, musette
Ted Daniel - trumpet, Moroccan bugle
Leroy Jenkins - violin (tracks 8-11)
Jane Robertson - cello (tracks 1-7)
Sirone - bass, wood flute
Eddie Moore - drums, saw, timpani, cymbal, gong, struck idiophone
Danny Johnson - percussion (tracks 1-7)

References

Impulse! Records albums
Dewey Redman albums
1973 albums